Tanzania striatus is a species of jumping spider in the genus Tanzania that lives in South Africa. It was first described in 2014.

References

Endemic fauna of South Africa
Salticidae
Spiders of South Africa
Spiders described in 2014